The 2012 Peace Cup was an invitational friendly football tournament that was held from July 19 to July 22. It was the fifth Peace Cup and was held in Suwon, South Korea.

Format
The 2012 tournament featured some major changes compared to previous tournaments. The number of teams participating was reduced from eight to four. Therefore, the teams would immediately be playing one another in sudden death mode. The draws for these pairings were decided via polls on the official website. Due to these changes, the tournament would last four days, rather than ten as previous tournaments did. All matches were played in the Suwon World Cup Stadium.

As always, the host of the tournament was South Korean club Seongnam Ilhwa Chunma. The other teams were partly chosen because of the South Korean football players they have in their squads.

Venues

Teams
 Seongnam Ilhwa Chunma (hosts)
 Hamburg
 Sunderland
 Groningen

Matches

Match A

Match B

Third place play-off

Final

Statistics

Goalscorers

2 goals
Mitchell Schet

1 goal
Éverton Santos
Ivo Iličević
Dennis Aogo
Fraizer Campbell
Ryan Noble
Connor Wickham
Marcus Berg
Suk Hyun-Jun

External links
 

2012
2012
Peace Cup
2012 in South Korean football
2012–13 in English football
2012–13 in German football
2012–13 in Dutch football